Thomas Petersson may refer to:
 Thomas Petersson (actor)
 Thomas Petersson (bishop)